This is a list of buildings and structures in Singapore. See respective sections for more detailed lists.

Singapore from end to end
Tiger Sky Tower

Arts venues

Esplanade - Theatres on the Bay
Parliament House, Singapore

Bridges
List of bridges in Singapore

Convention centres
Changi Exhibition Centre
Singapore Expo
Suntec Singapore International Convention and Exhibition Centre

Government buildings
City Hall, Singapore
Istana (as Government House from 1867 to 1959)
Police Cantonment Complex
Sri Temasek

Former government buildings

 Victoria Theatre and Concert Hall
Old Supreme Court Building, Singapore

Health specialist centres
List of hospitals in Singapore

Hotels
List of hotels in Singapore
Parkroyal on Pickering
Raffles Hotel
Raffles The Plaza
Swissôtel The Stamford
Gallery Hotel

Libraries
List of libraries in Singapore
National Library, Singapore

Military

 Fort Canning

Museums and memorials
List of memorials in Singapore
List of museums in Singapore
Asian Civilisations Museum
Raffles Museum of Biodiversity Research
Singapore Science Centre
Sun Yat Sen Nanyang Memorial Hall

Prisons
Changi Prison

Railway stations
 List of Singapore MRT stations
 List of Singapore LRT stations
 Tanjong Pagar railway station

Religious sites

Buddhist temples
Burmese Buddhist Temple
Foo Hai Ch'an Monastery
Hai Inn Temple
Kong Meng San Phor Kark See Monastery
Lian Shan Shuang Lin Monastery
Palelai Buddhist Temple
Poh Ern Shih Temple
Sakya Muni Buddha Gaya Temple
Singapore Buddhist Lodge
Sri Lankaramaya Buddhist Temple
Wat Ananda Metyarama Thai Buddhist Temple

Chinese religious pilgrimage site
 Kusu Island

Chinese temples
Ang Chee Sia Ong Temple
Chan Chor Min Tong
Fo Shan Ting Da Bo Gong Temple (Pulau Ubin)
German Girl Shrine (Pulau Ubin)
Hong San See
Jin Long Si Temple
Kwan Im Thong Hood Cho Temple
Tan Si Chong Su
Thian Hock Keng
Tou Mu Kung Temple
Yueh Hai Ching Temple

Churches
List of Roman Catholic churches in Singapore
Saint Andrew's Cathedral, Singapore
Kampong Kapor Methodist Church
Orchard Road Presbyterian Church
Prinsep Street Presbyterian Church
Telok Ayer Chinese Methodist Church
Wesley Methodist Church, Singapore

Indian temples
Sri Mariamman Temple

Mosques
List of mosques in Singapore
Masjid Al-Istiqamah
Masjid Hajjah Fatimah
Masjid Jamae
Masjid Sultan

Schools
List of schools in Singapore

Stadiums
List of stadiums in Singapore
National Stadium, Singapore

Other structures
Merlion
Pearl Bank Apartments
Singapore Flyer

See also
Black and white bungalow
National Monuments of Singapore
Shophouse
List of tallest buildings in Singapore
List of buildings